Béla Kovács (12 May 1910 - 14 June 1980) was a Hungarian politician and jurist, who served as Minister of Justice between 1953 and 1954. He was a judge of the Supreme Court.

References
 Magyar Életrajzi Lexikon

1910 births
1980 deaths
Hungarian communists
Justice ministers of Hungary